Stenocereus dumortieri is a  flowering plant in the family Cactaceae that is found in Querétaro, Mexico at elevations of 1800 meters.

Gallery

References

External links
 

dumortieri
Flora of Mexico